Mrugtrushna: The Other Side of the River is an upcoming Gujarati film directed by Darshan Ashwin Trivedi, starring Jayesh More, Karan Patel, Nishma Soni, Arya Sagar, and Khush Tahilramani. The plot follows four children living on the bank of the river and their dreams of crossing the river. The film is produced by Mrinal Kapadia and Devdutt Kapadia, and co-produced by Burzin Unwalla, Nishith Mehta, and Darshan Trivedi.

Mrugtrushna is the first installment of Trivedi's 'Illusion trilogy'. The dialogues of the film are written by Ankit Gor and Gaurang Anand. Film's music is composed by Nishith Mehta. The screenplay is written by the director. The film was selected for the 33rd International Film Festival for Children and Youth, and won the Golden Butterfly and Diploma of Honor for Best Screenplay.

It was released in India on 20 May 2022.

Cast
Jayesh More as Dost
Vishal Shah as Banevi
Sharvary Joshi as Kanchan Didi
Khush Tahilramani as Sameer
Bharat Thakkar as Gagan's Father
Ragi Jani as Ganpat Kaka
Nirmit Vaishnav as Sameer's Father
Nishma Soni as Tara
Arti Zala as Foi
Arya Sagar as Tejas
Komal Panchal as Gagan's Mother
Pauravi Joshi as Sameer's Mother
Jay Krushna Rathod as Mastar
Parmeshwar Sirshekar as Tara's Father
Happy Bhavasar as Tejas' Mother

Plot
The plot of the film revolves around four children living at the bank of the river, and their fantasy about the world across the river. The plot follows their journey how they cross the river to discover the world across.

Production
Films core subjects are the 'illusory experiences' and  the 'power of a dream'.

Trivedi wrote the script of the film originally in English, and then transformed it into Chhota Udaipur dialect, a variety of Gujarati language. The production work of the film was started in 2018 and completed in 2019. The film was set and shot in Chhota Udaipur, Hanfeshwar, Polo Forest, on the banks of river Narmada, Varsoda haveli and in tribal belt.

Release 
It was released in India on 20 May 2022.

Reception
The film was screened at Moscow International Children's Film Festival (2021), the only Indian film selected for the festival. It was also screened at UK Asian Film Festival (2021).

Accolades

References

External links
 

Films shot in Gujarat
Films set in Gujarat